Dorico is a scorewriter software; along with Finale and Sibelius, it is one of the three leading professional-level music notation programs. 

Dorico's development team consists of most of the former core developers of a rival software, Sibelius. After the developers of Sibelius were laid off in a 2012 restructuring by their corporate owner, Avid, most of the team were re-hired by a competing company, Steinberg, to create a new software. They aimed to build a "next-generation" music notation program, and released Dorico four years later, in 2016.

History 
The project was unveiled on 20 February 2013 by the Product Marketing Manager, Daniel Spreadbury, on the blog Making Notes, and the software was first released on 19 October 2016. 

The program's title Dorico was revealed on the same blog on 17 May 2016. The name honours the 16th-century Italian music engraver Valerio Dorico (1500 – c. 1565), who printed first editions of sacred music by Giovanni Pierluigi da Palestrina and Giovanni Animuccia and pioneered the use of a single impression printing process first developed in England and France.

The iPad version was released on 28 July 2021; it was the first major desktop scorewriter application to be made available on a mobile platform. It offers most of the functionality of the desktop app.

Features 
Dorico is known for its stability and reliability in creating aesthetically pleasing scores and its intuitive interface. User feedback influences Dorico's feature design, and the development team actively use the forum and Facebook group.

Automation 
Reviews have claimed that Dorico has become more efficient than other notation software. For example, a signature time-saving feature is its automatic creation of instrumental part layouts. Another signature feature is its automated condensing, where it combines multiple players' parts onto a single staff, such as for a conductor's score.

Keyboard input 
Dorico natively supports note input entirely from the computer keyboard without the need to use the mouse. It also supports MIDI input from a piano keyboard.

SMuFL music fonts 

The Standard Music Font Layout (SMuFL) standard was created by the Dorico development team at Steinberg. It provides a consistent standard way of mapping the thousands of musical symbols required by conventional music notation into a single font that can be used by a variety of software and font designers. It was first implemented in MuseScore, then in Dorico's first release and in Finale.

Version history

References

External links

YouTube Channel

Scorewriters